Canadian Pacific Railway 7000 is a diesel-electric locomotive ordered through Stone Franklin of Canada Ltd of Montreal and built by National Steel Car in Hamilton, Ontario, in 1937. One example was built for the Canadian Pacific Railway, a custom built one-of-a-kind unit using British Empire components to avoid heavy customs duties. It is preserved at the Canadian Railway Museum.

History

The locomotive was an early Canadian Pacific diesel. Before it was delivered in November 1937, the railway had only used self-propelled rail motor cars. The unit was ordered in 1935 from Stone Franklin of Canada Ltd of Montreal but was built by National Steel Car in Hamilton, Ontario. It used a 6-cylinder,  diesel prime-mover from Harland & Wolff of Belfast, Northern Ireland, with electrical equipment by Laurence Scott and Electromotors of Norwich, England.  CP 7000 was a double-truck, four-motored switching locomotive.  It cost $89,500 when built. 

The locomotive worked at the Hochelaga Yard in Montreal until Alco S-2 units arrived at the Yard in 1943. It was then leased to Marathon Paper Mills Ltd., in Peninsula (now Marathon), Ontario, for a period of 3–4 months before being purchased by the mill in October 1944. It operated for many years without a number until it was re-engined in 1951 with a 600-horsepower Caterpillar diesel engine.  It was removed from service in 1964 at the paper mill and offered to the Canadian Railway Museum in 1965, where it remains.

References

Standard gauge locomotives of Canada
Diesel-electric locomotives of Canada
7000